Salahuddin (born 14 February 1947, Aligarh, India; commonly known as Salahuddin Sallu) is a former Pakistani cricketer who played in five Tests from 1965 to 1969.

References

External links
 
 Salahuddin at CricketArchive
 "Salahuddin Ahmed Sallu – 50 Years with Pakistan Cricket" 

1947 births
Living people
Pakistan Test cricketers
International Cavaliers cricketers
People from Aligarh
Cricketers from Karachi
Muhajir people
Pakistani cricketers
Karachi cricketers
Karachi Blues cricketers
Karachi Whites cricketers
Pakistan Universities cricketers
Pakistan International Airlines cricketers
Pakistan International Airlines A cricketers
South Zone (Pakistan) cricketers
Pakistani cricket administrators